Mollas is a village and a former municipality in the Elbasan County, central Albania. At the 2015 local government reform it became a subdivision of the municipality Cërrik. The population at the 2011 census was 5,530. The municipality consists of the villages Mollas, Dasar, Selite, Linas, Kamunah, Dragot and Topojan.

Geography 
The village is located in an area consisting of 65% flat arable lands and 35% of hill country.

References

Administrative units of Cërrik
Former municipalities in Elbasan County
Villages in Elbasan County